1924 Olympics  may refer to:

The 1924 Winter Olympics, which were held in Chamonix, France
The 1924 Summer Olympics, which were held in Paris, France